is a Japanese professional football club located in Shimizu-ku, Shizuoka, Shizuoka Prefecture. S-Pulse currently competes in the J2 League, Japanese second tier of professional league football. The club was formed in 1991 as a founding member of the J.League ("Original Ten"), which began the following year. The club originally consisted of players drawn exclusively from Shizuoka Prefecture, a unique distinction at the time.

Given the club's youth when compared to many of their J1 peers, S-Pulse have had a relatively large impact on Japanese football. Since the game turned professional in 1992, they are one of the most prolific and consistent performers in cup competitions, having made no less than ten final appearances: five times in the Emperor's Cup and five times in the League Cup. Only Japan's most successful professional team, Kashima Antlers, have made more final appearances. They have won both of these competitions once and have also won the Japanese Super Cup twice and the Asian Cup Winners' Cup once. The club's most recent cup final was in the 2012 J.League Cup which ended in defeat to Kashima.

Despite the club's cup competition prowess, the J.League Division 1 title has so far eluded them. The closest S-Pulse came was in 1999 when, after winning the league's second stage, they lost out on the title in a penalty shootout. When scores remained level after both legs of the title deciding match, Júbilo Iwata, S-Pulse's local rivals, prevailed. Former S-Pulse and national team player Kenta Hasegawa, who made a substitute appearance in the second leg of this title decider, became club manager in 2005. He was the longest serving manager in the club's history, in office until 2010. He resigned at the end of the season after failing to win any competitions and was replaced by Afshin Ghotbi.

History

Shizuoka as a football prefecture
Headquarters are established in Shizuoka Prefecture called the football kingdom in Japan.
As a prefecture, Shizuoka had historically been a strong footballing area of Japan; in particular being noted for its nationally successful high school teams and the numerous national team players which had emerged from the prefecture over the years. The prefectural police force of Shizuoka actually has an anthropomorphic football as a mascot. The west of the prefecture was already home to the company team of Yamaha Motor Corporation who played in the Japan Soccer League and who would later go on to form Júbilo Iwata, but it was believed there was room for another team for the football-hungry population. An earlier attempt had been made in the 1970s with the local club belonging to Nippon Light Metal Corp., which briefly competed in the JSL Division 2 under the name Hagoromo Club. With the advent of the professional league at the start of the 1990s, the concept of creating a team to both sign and represent the local footballing talent was fomented.

Club formation
Shimizu S-Pulse was formed in early 1991 as Shimizu FC from the backing of local businesses and people. This was a beginning which made them unique among the founding clubs of the J.League, with all others ex-company teams turned professional. Two months after formation, the club name was officially changed to Shimizu S-Pulse. S-Pulse is a combination of the S from Shizuoka, Shimizu, Supporter and Soccer, and Pulse from English to mean the spirit of all those who support the team.

On February 4, 1991 S-Pulse were approved by the J.League to compete in the newly formed professional league to start the following year. The club played its first ever game against Gamba Osaka on July 4, 1992, a date which is celebrated as the club's memorial birthday. The match took place at the Nagai Stadium in Osaka. The club's first competitive game was in the 1992 League Cup against Nagoya Grampus on September 5 at the Mizuho Athletic Stadium, and ended in a 3–2 defeat. Their competitive home début was held at Nihondaira Stadium shortly after on September 9 against Yokohama Marinos, which S-Pulse won 2–1. S-Pulse's first league game was played in May 1993 away to Yokohama Flügels at Mitsuzawa Stadium. Flügels won 3–2. The first home league game was a 2–1 victory against Sanfrecce Hiroshima on May 19 of the same year.

Professional football
After being approved for participation in the J.League S-Pulse competed in the inaugural 1992 J.League Cup and made it to their first final. However, the dream start ended with defeat at the hands of Verdy Kawasaki. In 1993, S-Pulse became one of the ten founder members of the new J.League, and finished third after the 1st and 2nd stages were combined. Their second venture into the J.League Cup was another near miss, again losing in the final to Verdy Kawasaki. Finally, in 1996 the team got their hands on the trophy and also gained revenge on Verdy, beating them 5–4 on penalties in the final.

The year 1999 was marked with S-Pulse's first appearance in the Japanese Super Cup, replacing Yokohama Flügels after their merger with Yokohama Marinos. However, S-Pulse lost the match 2–1. After performing well in both league stages, S-Pulse were up against local rivals Júbilo Iwata in the title decider, and after a 3–3 aggregate draw, lost the tie 4–2 on penalties. The new millennium brought better results for S-Pulse. Victory in the Asian Cup Winners' Cup in 2000 and victory in the final of the Emperor's Cup in 2001 meant that the S-Pulse trophy cabinet was beginning to fill up, and victories in the 2001 and 2002 Japanese Super Cups meant that the club had won four cups in three years.

In 2005, S-Pulse closed the year with a run to the Emperor's Cup final in which they did not concede a single goal. However, this changed in the final against Urawa Red Diamonds, which they lost 2–1. After a near-miss in the league, avoiding a relegation play-off by only goal difference, manager Kenta Hasegawa's work started to pay off the following year. In both 2006 and 2007 S-Pulse performed strongly in the league and finished in 4th place, followed by a fifth place standing in 2008. However, early exits in both cup competitions in 2006 and 2007, means they are currently without a trophy for five years. This is the longest barren spell in their history, although in 2008 they came close, being defeated in the final of the League Cup by Oita Trinita.

In 2011, S-Pulse made the "Signing of the Century" by making a move to complete the signing of Swedish and Arsenal F.C legend Freddie Ljungberg. It is considered by many Japanese to be one of the greatest signings in league history. Many also believed that the signing would boost football in baseball-fanatic Japan, however Ljungberg departed, and subsequently retired, after  months with the club. Later managements would turn out to be a catalyst for S-Pulse's luck to run out in the next seasons.

S-Pulse would play four more seasons in J1, until their first-tier stay was broken in the 2015 season. The club was in good standing early in the first stage until they collapsed later, falling into the bottom three. Home fans were disappointed at the way their club was playing. S-Pulse failed to improve in the second stage, being at the relegation positions. After 23 seasons in the top flight, they were relegated to J2 (and the second tier) for the first time in their history after a 1–0 home loss to Vegalta Sendai on October 17, 2015.

S-Pulse bounced back to top flight football immediately, securing promotion to the J1 League on the final matchweek of the 2016 J2 League.

After six years at J1 League, in which they spent five of the six years on the lower half of the table, S-Pulse returned to J2 League after being confirmed relegation from the J1 on the last matchweek, having finished in 17th place, just above their rivals Júbilo Iwata.

Supporters
In common with other J.League teams, S-Pulse have a colourful and noisy collection of supporters who follow the team around the country. A supporter band is present at games home and away to help galvanise support and raise the decibel levels. The band models itself to a large degree after its Brazilian counterparts, and Latin rhythms and samba sounds predominate. For home games, S-Pulse's more vocal supporters gather in the second tier of The Kop; the stand behind the west goal at Nihondaira Stadium. Also in this area can be found S-Pulse's various organised supporter groups. These groups include fan clubs dedicated to specific players and are often identifiable by unique uniforms. These fan clubs work to organise events which include mass choreographed displays and the supporter band. Also housed in The Kop are S-Pulse's band of ultras, who each game take over a central area behind the goal which has been dubbed The Dragon Zone. Often physical, it is not uncommon for the area to descend into a mosh pit after important goals, and signs posted around the stand inform and caution general supporters of the area's lively nature. The club's official fan club has several branches around the country, and S-Pulse supporters are officially listed as the team's twelfth player.

Ownership
Although Suzuyo, Inc., which is a local major company, had become a parent company just at the present, since the Shimizu S-Pulse was born as a citizen club from the start, vulnerable time suited it in the past in terms of a fund.
As well as originally gathering its playing staff almost exclusively from Shizuoka prefecture, local corporation S-Lap Communications ran and financed the club. This was a company funded in part from Shimuzu citizens, but in main by Shizuoka Television. After the J.League bubble burst in the late 1990s, Shizuoka Television withdrew backing, and in 1998 only a drastic restructuring kept the club afloat. Ownership of S-Pulse was reorganized between local companies under the leadership of Shimizu-based Suzuyo Corporation. It is now run under the company title of S-Pulse, Inc.

In culture
Despite their relatively short history, S-Pulse have had some impact on popular culture beyond football. Current manager and former player of some eight years and over 200 appearances, Kenta Hasegawa, makes occasional appearances in popular manga and anime series Chibi Maruko-chan. In the show a boy with his name and referred to as Kenta-kun is sometimes seen. He loves football and is a classmate of title character Chibi Maruko. The author of the manga, Momoko Sakura, created this character after Hasegawa. Sakura and Hasegawa attended the same primary school during the same period. Unique S-Pulse related Chibi Maruko goods are also produced. In another example, two fictional characters from the popular Captain Tsubasa manga, who, on becoming professional footballers, join S-Pulse.

Stadium
Main articles: Nihondaira Sports Stadium, Shizuoka "Ecopa" Stadium, Kusanagi Athletic Stadium

S-Pulse's main home arena is the Nihondaira Sports Stadium located in Shimizu, with a capacity of 20,248. However, over their history home games have been staged at a number of grounds. The first decade of S-Pulse's existence sometimes saw 'home' games played outside of Shizuoka prefecture, including at the National Stadium in Tokyo. The most frequently used other venue was Kusanagi Athletic Stadium. Utilised almost equally with Nihondaira over S-Pulse's earliest years, this included six home games in 1993. Kusanagi was called home while Nihondairs was enlarged in 1994, and again while the pitch relaid in 2003. With a fully functioning Nihondaira, Kusanagi was used less commonly, with the most recent first team match being held there in 2003.

The most common reason for moving games is the restrictively low capacity of Nihondaira. This has often led the club to stage fixtures against neighbouring Júbilo Iwata and other high-profile clashes, at Shizuoka "Ecopa" Stadium. This stadium was built in 2001 for the following year's World Cup and has a capacity of 51,349. Despite still being in Shizuoka Prefecture, Ecopa is over an hour's travel from Shimizu, deep within the Jubilo catchment area. For such a fiercely contested derby, much of the home advantage is lost; a factor which contributed in part to the staging of the 2007 derby at Nihondaira despite demand for tickets far outstripping supply. The decision paid off with a home victory. 2007 saw all home games staged at Nihondaira for the first time since 1999. This was repeated in 2008, although between 2009 and 2015 Ecopa was used for at least one home league game. S-Pulse have chosen not to use Ecopa since 2015, playing all home league games at Nihondaira.

Naming rights

In October 2008 it was announced that naming rights would be sold for Nihondaira Stadium. In late November 2008 a deal was announced which would rename the stadium Outsourcing Stadium Nihondaira. The contract will run for four years starting from the 2009 season, and would be worth 90 000 000 per year.

A new 5-year deal sponsorship deal with IAI Corporation, a manufacturer of industrial robots, took effect on 1 March 2013. The stadium was renamed IAI Stadium Nihondaira, shortened by the club and supporters to I Sta. This sponsorship deal was extended a further five years in 2018.

Future

After filling Nihondaira on average over 81% for league games in 2008, in November of the same year the club expressed its desire for the ground, which is owned by Shizuoka City, to have its capacity expanded.

In 2020 the club restated their hope to build a new, larger home. In recent years various locations have been cited as a potential location for a new stadium, including next to Higashi-Shizuoka Station, and next to Shimuizu Station.

Training ground

Located near the famous Miho no Matsubara are S-Pulse's main training facilities. Named Miho Ground, training session are sometimes open to the public for autograph hunters. The Miho Ground has also housed the club offices since the club's foundation.

Rivalries

S-Pulse share Shizuoka Prefecture with fierce local rivals Júbilo Iwata. The rivalry dates back to the formation of the J.League when the newly formed S-Pulse were chosen ahead of Júbilo to take part in the first J.League season. Jubilo, who had existed as Yamaha FC in the Japan Soccer League since 1980, had to earn promotion via the 1992 season of the new Japan Football League. This has remained a bone of contention between long standing fans.

With Shizuoka long recognised as the homeland of football in Japan, the two teams have a history of fighting over the best players produced by the region's high schools and universities. Good examples being Naohiro Takahara and Takahiro Yamanishi, who, after graduating from Shimizu Higashi High School, went on to sign for the Júbilo team which won three J.League championships between 1997 and 2002.

Alongside off-field factors, S-Pulse and Júbilo are locked in a perpetual struggle for supremacy on the field. During the J.League's infancy, it was S-Pulse who experienced the greater success and support, but they found themselves in Iwata's shadow for long periods either side of the turn of the century. Recently, S-Pulse have once again emerged as the area's premier club, finishing above Júbilo in the league every season since 2006, and often enjoying further cup runs. 2008 was also the first year since 1995 that S-Pulse succeeded in drawing more supporters through the gates than their rivals.

Also based in Shizuoka are Honda FC and Fujieda MYFC, although neither currently play at the same level as S-Pulse, limiting any potential rivalry development to one-off cup pairings. Fujieda MYFC and Honda FC play just below the J. league in the Japan Football League. Despite always performing well, Honda FC have resisted professionalisation and so are unable to join the J.League. The forerunners to Avispa Fukuoka and Sagan Tosu were originally also based in Shizuoka Prefecture, but had to move to Kyushu because of the dominance and fan saturation of S-Pulse and Iwata.

Colours, crest and mascot

Colour, sponsors and manufacturers

Since the team's inception, the same colour combination for home shirts have been used each year. The colour scheme of orange shirts, shorts and socks was selected to reflect the famous local product of Shizuoka Prefecture; the mikan. The current bright orange hue, named S-Pulse Orange by the club, is the result of a gentle evolution from a more yellow/orange shade during the team's early years. At the advent of the J.League, S-Pulse were the only top division club in the country to wear orange, a distinction which is now shared with other top flight mainstays, such as Albirex Niigata and Omiya Ardija. There is currently no third kit. Goalkeeping colours have changed more over the seasons, with the current first choice kit all black, and all green being the second choice.

Kit manufacturers have been exclusively Puma since 1997, and prior to this was shared with Mizuno. Shirt sponsors have been fairly consistent over the team's sixteen-year history (see table below). The team's current main shirt sponsor is the local Suzuyo Group, with additional sponsorship panels on the lower neck and arms from confectionery company Glico, and Japan Airlines, respectively.

Kit evolution

Crest
From the club's formation up to 1996, the club used an earlier version of the team crest. while different, the previous design featured the same central lettering as the present badge. Unveiled for the 1997 season, the current team crest was designed around a globe to reflect the club's ambitions as a world class professional team. The head of the badge takes the iconic shape of Mount Fuji's perfect cone to symbolise the team's representation of Shizuoka; the home of Mount Fuji. The choice of blue to accompany the team's orange evokes Shimizu's history as an industrial port town and its proximity to the sea of Suruga Bay. The team crest differs from the team logo which is often used to represent the club. The logo uses the central lettering from the crest, an example of which being the club's shop sign.

Mascot
Named Palchan and sporting big, winglike ears, S-Pulse's mascot supports the team and entertains fans by performing choreographed, and often acrobatic, dance routines during the buildup to home games. He often performs with the help of his two younger siblings. Designed by professional cartoonist Guy Gilchrist, Palchan's name is taken from the English pal and the pul of S-Pulse. The suffix chan is an affectionate title commonly used in Japan. Sporting team number zero, Palchan goods are a consistent best seller with various merchandise available. S-Pulse also have a cheer leading team named Orange Wave. The team perform routines prior to kick off and half time as well as making various appearances at S-Pulse themed events in and around Shizuoka.

Brand
 
In and around the team's native Shizuoka City there are eight official club shops. Six of these are known as S-Pulse Dream House and serve as both club merchandise stores and match ticket offices. These can be found in Shizuoka, Shimizu, Fujieda, Suntō and Parche shopping centre, part of Shizuoka Station. The Shimizu Dream House also includes a projection screen and viewing area for the broadcasting of away games. The sixth, and newest, Dream House opened in March 2008 in Fuji City. There are two further S-Pulse shops, with one located in Yaizu, and one in S-Pulse Dream Plaza.

S-Pulse Dream Plaza is a shopping and entertainment complex in Shimizu, housing various attractions including restaurants, a ferris wheel, cinema and a football museum. From the nearby Shimizu Port, the S-Pulse Dream Ferry service runs daily to Izu. The team also lends its name to a series of futsal courts named, perhaps predictably, S-Pulse Dream Fields. These facilities are located in Fujieda, Fuji, Sunto and in Shimizu.

Dream Plaza can be found in a redeveloped part of Shimizu Port near the appropriately named S-Pulse Street. This is a road running into the city from the port area of Shimizu and is lined with various statues, monuments and art works related to and inspired by the city's strong association with football. This includes foot and hand prints cast into metal of former notable players, and several S-Pulse-related statues. S-Pulse Street is also home to the Shimizu Branch of the S-Pulse Dream House.

The S-Pulse brand also extends into motorcycle racing, with the S-Pulse Dream Racing Team bearing the football team's name, logo and mascot. The team competes in the All Japan Road Race ST600 class.

League and cup record

Key

League history
 Division 1 (J1 League) : 1993–2015
 Division 2 (J2 League) : 2016
 Division 1 (J1 League) : 2017–2022
 Division 2 (J2 League) : 2023–present

Honours

National

Cups
Emperor's Cup
 Winners: 2001
J.League Cup
 Winners: 1996
Japanese Super Cup
 Winners: 2001, 2002

International
Asian Cup Winners' Cup
 Winners: 1999–2000

Players

Current squad
.

Out on loan

Noted players
Players who have been named Player of the Year or Young Player of the Year in the J.League:

World Cup players
World Cup 1994
  Ronaldão
World Cup 1998
  Teruyoshi Ito
  Toshihide Saito
World Cup 2002
  Daisuke Ichikawa
  Ryuzo Morioka
  Alex
  Kazuyuki Toda
World Cup 2006
  Cho Jae-Jin
World Cup 2010
  Shinji Okazaki

Club officials
For the 2023 season.

Managers

Notes

References

External links
 

  Shimizu S-Pulse official site 
  Shimizu S-Pulse official site
  S-Pulse Dream Ferry official site 
  S-Pulse Plaza official site

 
J.League clubs
Football clubs in Japan
Association football clubs established in 1991
Sports teams in Shizuoka Prefecture
Tourist attractions in Shizuoka Prefecture
Emperor's Cup winners
Japanese League Cup winners
1991 establishments in Japan
Phoenix clubs (association football)
Asian Cup Winners Cup winning clubs
Shizuoka (city)